Hami (also Romanized as Ḩāmī; also known as Kāmi) is a village in Khusf Rural District, Central District, Khusf County, South Khorasan Province, Iran. At the 2006 census, its population was 95, in 29 families.

References 

Populated places in Khusf County